Hani ibn Urwa was a Kufan leader who hosted Muslim ibn Aqil and was killed by Ubayd Allah ibn Ziyad, the governor of Kufa, due to ibn Ziyad enmity towards Ahl al-Bayt.

Hani is buried behind the Great Mosque of Kufa, Kufa, Iraq, alongside Mukhtar al-Thaqafi.

See also
 Ja'far al-Sadiq
 Ali ibn Abu Talib
 Hassan ibn Ali
 Hussain ibn Ali
 Muslim ibn Aqeel
 The Battle of Karbala
 Al-Mukhtar

References

Iraqi Shia Muslims
Yemeni Shia Muslims
680 deaths